Japa  is the meditative repetition of a mantra or a divine name. It is a practice found in Hinduism, Jainism, Sikhism, and Buddhism, with parallels found in other religions.

Japa may be performed while sitting in a meditation posture, while performing other activities, or as part of formal worship in group settings. The mantra or name may be spoken softly, loud enough for the practitioner to hear it, or it may be recited silently within the practitioner's mind.

Etymology 
The Sanskrit word japa is derived from the root jap-, meaning "to utter in a low voice, repeat internally, mutter". It can be further defined as ja to destroy birth, death, and reincarnation and pa meaning to destroy ones sins.

Monier-Williams states that the term appears in Vedic literature such as in the Aitareya Brahmana (Rigveda) and the Shatapatha Brahmana (Yajurveda). The term means muttering, whispering or murmuring passages from the scripture, or charms, or names of deity. Often it is the repetitive singing of a verse or mantra, sometimes counted with the help of a rosary which is called japamala. A related word, japana appears in Book 12 of the Mahabharata, where muttering prayers is described as a form of religious offering.

The concept of japa is also found in early Buddhist texts, and is very common in Tibetan Buddhism literature.

According to the sage Patanjali (400 CE), Japa is not the repetition of word or phase but rather contemplation on the meaning of the mantra, this definition sometimes persists across different sources.

Varieties

Beads 

In some forms of japa, the repetitions are counted using a string of beads known as a japamala. Many different types of materials are used for japa. The number of beads in the japamala is generally 108. It is not uncommon for people to wear japa beads around their neck, although some practitioners prefer to carry them in a bead-bag in order to keep them clean.

Degrees of loudness 
Japa may be performed in varying degrees of loudness:

 Vaikhari japa is spoken loud enough so that, although this is not why it is so loud (unless it is a group japa session), nearby people can hear it recited. It may be useful when there are other sounds nearby (though some consider this to be a mistake) or when concentration is difficult and is thus considered most suitable for beginners.
 Upamshu japa is said quietly, at a whisper. It is said to be one hundred times more effective than vaikhari japa. During upamshu japa the practitioner's lips should barely move so it is difficult for an observer to see that anything is being said.
 Manasika japa is recited in the mind. It is said to be one thousand times more effective than upamshu japa and thus 100 000 times more effective than vaikhari japa. It is also said to be difficult or  impossible to practice for those who are not already grounded in vaikhari japa practice.

Likhita japa 
Likhita japa is the writing of a mantra while, usually, reciting it aloud at the same time. Proponents say it is more effective than simply reciting the mantra aloud. Likhita japa is often written in a book dedicated to the purpose. Books intended for shorter mantras have a grid of rectangular cells with each cell holding one instance of the mantra. Practitioners may use different coloured ink to write in certain cells in order to make a decorative or symbolic pattern.

Mantracakras 
Tibetan Buddhists include japa meditation as a large part of their religious practices. In Tibet, states Harvey Alper, the prayer wheels are instruments for japa. The practice of nembutsu in Pure Land Buddhism is analogous to japa.

Aims 
The stated aim, or goal of japa may vary greatly depending on the mantra involved and the religious philosophy of the practitioner. In both Buddhist and Hindu traditions mantras may be given to aspirants by their guru, after some form of initiation. The stated goal could be moksha, nirvana, bhakti, or simple personal communion with a divine power in a similar way to prayer. Many gurus and other spiritual teachers, and other religious leaders, especially Hindu and Buddhist, teach that these represent different names for the same transformed state of consciousness. However, this claim is not made about mantras that are not intended for spiritual growth and self-realization.

Similar states have been reached by adherents to other major faith traditions, using prayers from their own traditions.

Analogues in other traditions 
Some Catholic prayer forms that involve repetition, such as use of the Rosary or one of various chaplets, are similar to japa, although the practices are not identical because their aims differ. Mental methods of repeated short prayers, very similar to japa are also used in Christian traditions, most notably the practice of repeating the Jesus Prayer found in the Eastern Orthodox Church. Moreover, the goal of ajapa japa is quite similar to the Christian aim of "unceasing prayer". The practice of dhikr by Sufis is similar to japa. The two main Sikh scriptures open with sections, named after the term, and these are called Japji Sahib and Jaap Sahib.

See also 

Popular Japa mantras
 
Om
Mahamrityunjaya (mantra)
Om Namah Sivaya
Gayatri (mantra)
Hare Krishna (mantra)
Nam-myōhō-renge-kyō
Om Mani Padme Hum
Om Namo Bhagavate Vasudevaya
Om Namo Narayanaya
Om Tare Tuttare Ture Svaha
Sri Ram Jay Ram Jay Jay Ram
Swaminarayan (mantra)

General
 
Ajapa japa
Japamala
Nama sankeerthanam
Nembutsu
Pranava yoga
Dhikr
Hesychasm
Jesus Prayer
Meditation
Prayer

Notes

References

Bibliography 

 
 
 
 
 
 
 
 
 
 
 
 
 
 
 
 
 
 
 
 
 
 

Hindu prayer and meditation
Language and mysticism
Mantras
Meditation
Tantric practices